Prior's Coppice is a  biological Site of Special Scientific Interest south of Oakham in Rutland. It is managed by the Leicestershire and Rutland Wildlife Trust.

This wood is on poorly drained soils derived from Jurassic Upper Lias clay and glacial boulder clay. The dominant trees are ash and oak, with field maple and hazel in the shrub layer. There is a diverse ground flora typical of ancient clay woods.

There is access from Leighfield Lane.

References

Leicestershire and Rutland Wildlife Trust
Sites of Special Scientific Interest in Rutland